Ruth Elkrief (born 1 December 1960 in Meknes, Morocco) is a French-Moroccan television journalist. She worked on the 24-hour news channel BFM TV from 2005 to 2021.

Early life
Ruth Elkrief was born in Meknes, Morocco. Her great-uncle, Shalom Messas, was a rabbi. She emigrated to France with her family as a teenager.

Elkrief graduated from Sciences Po. She earned a postgraduate degree in journalism from the Centre de Formation des Journalistes.

Career
Elkrief was a correspondent for TF1 in Washington, D.C. in 1990. A year later, in 1991, she was appointed as the head of its political programmes. She joined La Chaîne Info in 1994 and BFM TV in 2005. In January 2021, she announced that she was leaving the channel. Fabien Namias, vice-managing director of the TF1 group's all-news channel, announced, on 31 March 2021, that Ruth Elkrief would be joining LCI.

Elkrief became a Knight of the Legion of Honour in 2008.

Personal life
Elkrief is married to Claude Czechowski. They have two daughters.

References

1960 births
Living people
People from Meknes
Moroccan emigrants to France
20th-century Moroccan Jews
French people of Moroccan-Jewish descent
Sciences Po alumni
20th-century French journalists
21st-century French journalists
French women journalists
French television journalists
Chevaliers of the Légion d'honneur
Women television journalists
20th-century French women
21st-century French women